Tenderness is an album of duets by vibraphonist Walt Dickerson and bassist Richard Davis recorded in 1977 for the SteepleChase label but not released until 1985.

Reception

Allmusic reviewer Scott Yanow said "Although the music is often complex and a touch esoteric, the attractive sound of the intimate duo makes the performances much more accessible than they would normally be".

Track listing
All compositions by Walt Dickerson
 "Tenderness" - 9:40
 "Divine Gemini" - 3:39
 "So Thoughtful" - 4:47
 "The Road Must Bend" - 9:02
 "Play Son Play" - 8:08

Personnel 
Walt Dickerson - vibraphone
Richard Davis - bass

References 

1985 albums
Walt Dickerson albums
Richard Davis (bassist) albums
SteepleChase Records albums